The Old Boys is a 1964 comic novel written by Anglo-Irish author William Trevor.

Plot summary
The story concerns a group of elderly men on the board of a society for the old boys of an unnamed English public school and the power politics and old rivalries that come into play during the election of a new president for the Old Boys Association. The old boys themselves have developed various ways of coping with retirement and loneliness and life's disappointments but they all take a keen interest in their old school, none more so than Jaraby, who desires and expects to be elected as the new president, but is nervous about the possibility of being opposed by Nox, his former fag.

Reviews

 The New York Times
 The New Yorker
 The Telegraph

References

1964 novels
Works by William Trevor
British comedy novels
The Bodley Head books
Hawthornden Prize-winning works